The women's  100 metre freestyle event at the 2001 World Aquatics Championships took place 25 July. The heats and semi-finals  were held on 24 July.

Results

Heats

Semi-finals

Final

References
FINA Official

Swimming at the 2001 World Aquatics Championships